Orczy, Orczi:

Orci, village in Somogy County, Hungary
Orczy, a neighborhood in Budapest's VIII district, Hungary
Orczy family (Orczy de Orczi, :hu:Orczy család), Hungarian nobility originating from Orci
Lőrinc Orczy (:hu:Orczy Lőrinc), poet
Béla Orczy (1822–1917), politician
Emma Orczy (Baroness Orczy, 1865–1947)
Orțișoara (Orczyfalva in Hungarian), village in Romania

See also
List of titled noble families in the Kingdom of Hungary

Orczy family
Hungarian nobility
Hungarian-language surnames